Jozef Žabka (born 28 January 1975) is a Slovak cyclist. He competed in the Men's madison at the 2004 Summer Olympics.

References

1975 births
Living people
Slovak male cyclists
Olympic cyclists of Slovakia
Cyclists at the 2004 Summer Olympics
Sportspeople from Bratislava